The National Synarchist Union is a Mexican political organization. It was historically a movement of the Roman Catholic extreme right, similar to clerical fascism and Falangism, implacably opposed to the left wing and secularist policies of the Institutional Revolutionary Party (PRI) and its predecessors that governed Mexico from 1929 to 2000 and from 2012 to 2018. The organization was notably the only explicit right-wing movement in Mexico to garner such nation-wide support and influence during this era. At its peak in 1940, there were approximately 500,000 registered members. Mostly active in the late 1930s and early 1940s, its support for the Axis in World War II damaged its reputation. The organization experienced intense infighting in the mid-1940s which ultimately led to multiple schisms. The organization was dissolved as a political party in 1951 and largely faded into obscurity outside the city of Guanajuato, where it retained some local influence. In the 1980s, the UNS was reconstituted as the Mexican Democratic Party, which held seats in the Chamber of Deputies from 1979 to 1988, peaking at 12 Deputies in the 1982 election but losing its presence in 1988; the Mexican Democratic Party (PDM) dissolved in 1997, though two groups both claiming to be the legitimate UNS continue to exist.

History

Formation
The UNS was founded in May 1937, during the leftist administration of President Lázaro Cárdenas (1934–40). It was developed by a group of Catholic political activists led by José Antonio Urquiza, who was murdered in April 1938. It was a revival of the Catholic reaction that drove the Cristero War (that ended in 1929), and its core was centred in the Bajío rural bourgeoisie and professional lower middle-class, where Catholicism was very strong. The group published the "Sinarquista Manifesto," opposing the policies of the government of President Lázaro Cárdenas. The Manifesto declared that "it is absolutely necessary that an organization composed of true patriots exists". The group's date of formation, 23 May, is celebrated annually in León, Guanajuato by the UNS membership.

The UNS was led by Salvador Abascal, a hard-liner, from 1940 to 1941 when he stood down in order to set up a synarchist commune in Baja California with the more moderate Manuel Torres Bueno becoming leader. The group was fond of large scale publicity stunts, such as the "takeovers" they launched in Guadalajara, Jalisco and Morelia in 1941. It has been stated that these temporary affairs amounted to little more than symbolic gestures but nonetheless helped to demonstrate the support the UNS enjoyed amongst the peasantry of the Western states.

Synarchist involvement in regional protest groups and political parties was both a reality and a regularly used accusation aimed at discrediting the opposition. The Civic Union of León, one such local party active in the mid-1940s, was dominated by a cadre of synarchists in leadership positions. For example, Austreberto Aragon Maldonado, whose Liga de Resistencia de Usarios del Agua de Oaxaca—a group that supported improvement in the water supply in Oaxaca—enjoyed widespread support in the region, he was regularly denounced by the state government as a synarchist. This occurred despite Maldonado's regular efforts to deny any involvement in the UNS and taking care not to involve himself with any extremist groups. Maldonado was targeted in this way due to the broad-based support his movement enjoyed and the possibility that it could become a focus for wider resistance.

Decline

The UNS was firmly pro-Axis powers during World War II, and its propaganda increased in this direction following the increase in anti-American feeling engendered in Mexico by the Sleepy Lagoon murder. Government schemes aimed at taming the UNS, notably giving the land in Baja California to Abascal's followers, did not prove a success and soon it was felt by the government that the group had to be controlled. President Manuel Ávila Camacho placed a ban on the UNS holding public meetings in June 1944 at a time when factionalism was dividing the movement. Some radical members went rogue, including one, De La Lama y Rojas, who on 14 April 1944 shot at Camacho and bemoaned the President's survival with the words "I was not able, sadly, to complete my mission". De La Lama y Rojas was shot and killed in police custody soon after the failed attack. The movement split in two in 1945 when Carlos Athie replaced Torres Bueno as the leader. The deposed leader started his own group, and both factions claimed the UNS name. Above all however the group was outmanoeuvred by the policies of the Camacho government, which maintained a policy of openly supporting Catholicism whilst also enacting legislation aimed at improving the lot of the working classes, effectively occupying political space that would normally be associated with critics from the right and left respectively.

Revival

In 1946 the Torres Bueno faction regrouped as the Popular Force Party (Partido Fuerza Popular). This party was banned in 1949 along with the Mexican Communist Party as part of a wider policy against "extremism". In 1951, however, when it was clear that the more moderate National Action Party (PAN) had become the main party of opposition to the PRI government, the Synarchist leader Juan Ignacio Padilla converted the movement to a non-party one promoting conservative Catholic social doctrine, promoted through co-operatives, credit unions and Catholic trade unions. Nonetheless, the PAN actively sought cooperation with the Sinarquistas as part of its attempts to form a mass movement, and the Synarchist movement was active on behalf of the party during the 1958 election campaigns. The group also established links with Opus Dei, which partially funded the Synarchists in the late 1960s by diverting funds to the Synarchist journal Hoja de Combate.

Synarchism, which had become largely localised to Guanajuato, was revived as a political movement in the 1970s through the Mexican Democratic Party (PDM), whose candidate, Ignacio González Gollaz, polled 1.8 percent of the vote at the 1982 presidential election; in the same year the PDM won 10 seats in the Chamber of Deputies. In midterm elections in 1985, but in the 1988 elections it lost all 12 seats it had held in the Chamber, never to return. The party soon split, with both factions taking up the UNS name once more; in 1994, the rump party polled a dismal 0.4% of the vote; the PDM was formally dissolved by the Federal Electoral Institute in 1997. The split was never ended, and to date, there are two organisations, both calling themselves the Unión Nacional Sinarquista. One has an apparently right-wing orientation, the other is apparently left-wing, but they both have the same philosophical roots. A group of former PDM/UNS organizers sought to organize a new party by the PDM starting in 2013 but have yet to be admitted to the electoral register.

Ideology
The ideology of the UNS derived from the clerical fascism that was a major strand of Catholic social thinking of the 1920s and 1930s, based on the papal encyclical Rerum novarum of Pope Leo XIII, which also influenced the regimes of Engelbert Dollfuss in Austria, António de Oliveira Salazar in Portugal and Francisco Franco in Spain. Taking its impetus from the same strand of ultra-conservative Catholicism that had informed the Cristeros, the group sought to mobilise the peasantry against "atheistic and communist tendencies". It stressed social co-operation and corporatism as opposed to the class conflict of socialism, and hierarchy and respect for authority as opposed to liberalism. In the context of Mexican politics, this meant opposition to the centralist, anti-clerical and social democratic policies of the PRI government. As a result, UNS members were denounced as fascists and persecuted by the Cárdenas government and the group's ability to impact Mexican politics was hindered.

In 1949, the UNS was banned by the authorities along with the Mexican Communist Party but continued to exist on a largely local level in Guanajuato under various names; the party became a social movement in 1951 but was largely unsuccessful; a small revival in the 1980s was not sustained and by 1988 the UNS electoral vehicle, the Mexican Democratic Party, had lost all seats in Congress before dissolving in 1997.

In popular culture
In the 1981 Luis Valdez Broadway play Zoot Suit and film of the same name, one character brings it to the attention of the protagonist that the popular Chicano styles and mannerisms of the day had been pegged as stemming from sinarquismo with sympathies for the Axis powers by the yellow press.

In John Huston's 1984 adaptation of the Malcolm Lowry novel Under the Volcano'', a sinarquista follows the consul and his family, eventually murdering Albert Finney's character, Jeffery Firmin.

References
Informational notes

Citations

1937 establishments in Mexico
Catholicism and far-right politics
Far-right politics in Mexico
Mexican nationalism
National Political Associations in Mexico
National syndicalism
Organizations established in 1937
Fascism in Mexico
Falangist parties
Fascist parties
Anti-communist parties